Pousghin may refer to:
Pousghin, Boudry, Burkina Faso
Pousghin, Zam, Burkina Faso